Johann Heinrich Zopf (6 April 1691 – 1 February 1774) was a German historian.

1691 births
1774 deaths
18th-century German historians
People from Gera
Martin Luther University of Halle-Wittenberg alumni
German male non-fiction writers